Local elections were held in Zamboanga City on May 10, 2004, within the Philippine general election. The voters elected for the elective local posts in the city: the mayor, vice mayor, 12 councilors and one representative from its lone district.

Mayoral and vice mayoral elections
Mayor Maria Clara Lobregat died of complications in January 2004, paving the mayoralty race for the ruling Laban ng Demokratikong Pilipino wide open since she was the presumptive nominee running for a third term. Vice-Mayor Erbie Fabian took her place as acting mayor.

Lobregat's son, incumbent Congressman Celso Lobregat became the standard-bearer of the LDP, and incumbent Mayor Fabian will run for the post left by Celso. Celso picked Councilor Beng Climaco as his running-mate.

Results
The candidate for district representative, mayor, and vice mayor with the highest number of votes wins the seat; they are voted separately; therefore, they may be of different parties when elected.

House of Representatives election

Lone District
Incumbent Vice-Mayor Erbie Fabian is running for the post against former Mayor Manuel Dalipe.

Mayoral elections
Incumbent Congressman Celso Lobregat is running for mayor against prominent businessman Lepeng Wee and Councilor Charlie Mariano.

Vice-mayoral elections
The vice-mayorship is vacant since Vice-Mayor Erbie Fabian took office upon Mayor Lobregat's death. Incumbent Councilor Beng Climaco runs against veteran politician Jaime Cabato.

City council elections
Zamboanga City elects twelve councilors to the city council. The twelve candidates with the highest number of votes wins the seats.

|-bgcolor=black
|colspan=5|

See also
Philippine House of Representatives elections in the Zamboanga Peninsula, 2004
2004 Philippine general election

References

External links
Official website of the Commission on Elections
 Official website of National Movement for Free Elections (NAMFREL)
Official website of the Parish Pastoral Council for Responsible Voting (PPCRV)

Elections in Zamboanga City